Clare Twomey  (born 1968 in Ipswich) is a London-based visual artist and researcher, working in performance, serial production, and site-specific installation.

Education and academic career
Twomey attended the Edinburgh College of Art from 1991 to 1994 and received an MA in Ceramics and Glass from the Royal College of Art in London in 1996. In 2011 she became a Research Fellow in the School of Media, Arts and Design at the University of Westminster, where she is affiliated with the Ceramics Research Centre.

Work 
Twomey's work typically involves intense research, collaboration in fabrication, and interactive presentations.  A recurring theme in her work is the relationship that binds people to things.  Her use of the medium of clay involves various forms of the material, including raw clay and powder, and techniques and processes including slip cast and factory production. Twomey sees her practice as research: she has explained that she is "engaged in a process of inquiry, an exploration of ideas, predicated on exploring characteristics of clay."

Twomey was appointed Member of the Order of the British Empire (MBE) in the 2022 New Year Honours for services to art.

Selected works

Consciousness/conscience 
Between 2001 and 2004 Consciousness/conscience was exhibited in a variety of places including the Tate, Liverpool; Crafts Council, London; and Icheon, Korea.  At each of the sites of installation, between 3000 and 8000 hollow bone china tiles were created to be displayed on the floor.  As the viewer walked through the installation, the tiles were crushed underfoot, causing the viewer to be an active participant in shaping the work and challenging the viewer's perception of both the gallery space and the permanence of the work.  The artwork was thus completed through the destruction of the tiles.  Consciousness/Conscience has been interpreted as showing how the artist's work is "influenced by observations of human interaction and political behavior and peruses her interest in space, architecture, intervention and the gallery as destination."

Trophy 
In 2006 Trophy was exhibited at the Victorian and Albert Museum.  This one-day exhibition displayed 4000 sculptures of cast bluebirds that were created at the Wedgwood Factory.  Each bluebird was stamped with a W for where it was made, V&A for where it would be exhibited, and CT for the artist's initials.  Viewers became collaborative performers when they were asked to take one of the birds home as a 'Trophy.'  These active participants who took these trophies were asked to send a photograph back to Twomey of the birds in their new home.  "Trophy continues to develop as is spreads out across hundreds of private locations"

Monument 
In 2009, Clare Twomey created the work Monument for the Middlesbrough Institute of Modern Art as part of the exhibition Possibilities and Losses: Transitions in Clay, which she helped to curate. This exhibition included Keith Harrison, Linda Sormin and  Neil Brownsword.  For Monument, 30 cubic meters of ceramic waste were piled up 8 meters high. Inspired by looking at a pile of broken china from the Johnson Porcelain Tile Factory in Stoke-on-Trent, this piece was made up of discarded seconds and manufacturing mistakes.  The scale of the pile created tension in the work because the pile seemed as though it could crumble at any moment.

Forever 
In Twomey's first solo American show (2011), Twomey observed the Frank and Harriet Burnlaps collection of 1,345 pieces of ceramics at the Nelson Atkins Museum of Art.  In this exhibition she explored permanence, responsibility, memory, desirability, the value and process of making through looking at one specific item from the collection, a sandbach cup.  Twomey worked with the ceramic company, Hartley Greens and Co. Leeds Pottery  to cast 1,345 cups.  Working from a similar conceptual framework as Trophy, Twomey created a system where viewers could apply to own a cup if they signed a contract promising to take care of the cup forever.

Collecting the Edges 
In 2011 Twomey created a museum wide installation at the Denver Art Museum in conjunction with Overthrown, Clay without Limits.  This group show included artists such as Annabeth Rosen, Kristen Morgin, Jeanne Quinn, Walter McConnell, Heather Mae Ericsson, and  Kim Dickey  as well as many others.  Collecting the Edges brought attention to the museum's architecture by creating a visual intervention which highlighted corners, ceilings and other spaces in the museum.  Collecting the Edges piled red, powdered, Colorado clay  into these specific spaces spreading the exhibition throughout the whole museum.  In an interview in Ceramics Now, Twomey stated  "When visiting a site, one must arrive with a very open mind, I had our first visit with no planned ideas for the work.  I made a response to the architecture experienced, and this was vastly influential with the development of the concept."  She then goes on to state that she sees this piece as "A reminder of a moment in time, rather than a demand."

Humanity is in Our Hands 
For Humanity In Our Hands, Clare Twomey, along with many other artists worked with the Keep the Memory Alive project, whose mission is to pair survivors of genocide with artists to bring their stories to life for the next generation.  Twomey was paired with Siskc Jakupovic, who survived the Omarska Concentration Camp in the Bosnian War.  In one of their exchanges Jakupovic shared a story about how in the concentration camp, they carved spoons for each other out of wood and shards of broken glass.  From this story, and with the analogy that spoons can nurture and feed each other, Twomey created her piece Humanity is in our Hands.

On 27 January 2015, Holocaust Remembrance Day, Twomey distributed invitations to people walking over Westminster Bridge.  "Today you are invited to be part of a new work, your words will be placed on thousands of beautiful porcelain objects that will be made in the coming year.  These objects will be handed back to the public as gifts on Westminster Bridge, on this date one year from now, 27th of January 2016. The recipients will become custodians of your thoughts." The question she asked the pedestrians walking over the bridge  was 'What human qualities allow society of flourish?' Over the next year Twomey created 2000 porcelain spoons with the answers she received.  The following year, on 27 January 2016, she gave the spoons back to the pedestrians on the bridge.

Exhibits 
 2016  Humanity is in Our Hands, In conjunction with Keep the Memory Alive
 2014  Piece by Piece, The Gardiner Museum, Toronto, Canada
 2013  Exchange, Foundling Museum, London, UK
 2012  Clare Twomey-Plymouth Porcelain: A New Collection,  Plymouth City Museum and Art Gallery
 2011  Present Traces, The Magic of Clay, Holtegaard, Denmark
 2011  Overthrown: Clay without Limits, Denver Art Museum
 2010  Made in China, West Norway Museum of Decorative Art, Bergen, Norway
 2010  Is it Madness. Is it Beauty, Siobhan Davies Studios, London, UK
 2010  Forever, The Nelson-Atkins Museum of Art, Kansas, USA
 2010  A Dark Day in Paradise, the Royal Pavilion, Brighton, UK
 2009  Specimen,  Royal Academy of Arts, London, UK
 2009  The Collection, Victoria and Albert Museum, London, UK
 2009  Monument, Zuiderzee Museum, Holland
 2008  Witness, Jerwood Space, London UK
 2007  Blossom, Eden Project, UK
 2006  Scribe, Dr Johnson's House, London, UK
 2006  Trophy, Victoria and Albert Museum, London UK
 2004  Heirloom, Misson Gallery, Swansea
 2001-2004  Consciousness/Conscience, Tate, Liverpool, Craft Council London, and Icheon Korea

Awards 
Twomey received the AHRC Behind the Scenes at the Museum award from the University of Westminster, London in 2011.  She has twice been awarded ACE funding: in 2009 for Specimen at the Royal Academy, and in 2006 for Trophy at the Victoria and Albert Museum. In 2004, Twomey became an AHRC Research Fellow with the University of Westminster, and in 2002 the London Visual Arts Fund put her on the London Arts Board.  In 2001 she won the City of Nyon Exhibition Prize at the Porcelain Triennial Exhibition and was added to the Selected Makers Index of the Crafts Council.  In 1999 Twomey received an exhibition prize at Ceramic Contemporaries 3 and in 1998 she received the membership award of the Royal British Society of Sculptors.

Public collections 
Twomey's work is included in a number of significant public and private collections, including the Swiss National Museum in Nyon, Switzerland, the Museo Internazionale Delle Ceramiche in Faenza, Italy, the Hungarian National Ceramics Collection in Kesckemet Hungary, in the entrance atrium at the Great Ormond Street Hospital in London, the national archive of The Wedgwood Collection in Great Britain and the Victoria and Albert Museum in London, England.

References

External links 
 Exchange: Interview with artist Clare Twomey
 Clare Twomey (artist's website)

1968 births
Living people
20th-century English women artists
21st-century English women artists
20th-century ceramists
21st-century ceramists
Alumni of the Edinburgh College of Art
Alumni of the Royal College of Art
Artists from Ipswich
British ceramicists
British women ceramicists
Members of the Order of the British Empire